The 2017 Toyota Owners 400 was a Monster Energy NASCAR Cup Series race held on April 30, 2017, at Richmond International Raceway in Richmond, Virginia. Contested over 400 laps on the 0.75 mile (1.2 km) asphalt short track, it was the ninth race of the 2017 Monster Energy NASCAR Cup Series season.

Joey Logano won the race, his 18th career win in the Monster Energy NASCAR Cup Series, having done it from the rear of the field. This race was his 300th Cup Series start. However, on May 4, 2017, due to a rear suspension issue, Logano's win was encumbered. It did not count as a ticket to the Playoffs, which ultimately cost Logano a berth in the post-season, since he did not win again during the regular season nor point his way in.

Report

Background

Richmond International Raceway (RIR) is a 3/4-mile (1.2 km), D-shaped, asphalt race track located just outside Richmond, Virginia in Henrico County. It hosts the Monster Energy NASCAR Cup Series and Xfinity Series. Known as "America's premier short track", it formerly hosted a NASCAR Camping World Truck Series race, an IndyCar Series race, and two USAC sprint car races.

Entry list

First practice

Qualifying

Qualifying results

Practice (post-qualifying)

Second practice

Final practice

Race

First stage
Matt Kenseth led the field to the green flag at 2:16 p.m. Erik Jones made contact with Kasey Kahne exiting Turn 2 on the first lap, leading to a left-front tire cut and slamming the wall on the seventh lap of the race. Jones, after being released from the infield care center, said he and Kahne, were "three-wide right on the start and then the 5 ran us up into the fence. I was trying not to wreck everybody and then a couple laps later the GameStop Prey Toyota Camry cut a left-front tire. It’s just really a heartbreaking day. It’s not what we wanted, but we’ll just have to come back next week with another fast race car and try to run up front again.” He went on to finish last.

The race restarted on lap 12. The second caution flew on lap 65 when Ricky Stenhouse Jr. made contact with the wall in Turn 3. Chris Buescher, Kyle Busch and Dale Earnhardt Jr. restarted from the tail-end of the field for speeding.

The race restarted on lap 72. Kenseth won the first stage and the third caution flew for the conclusion of the first stage.

Second stage
The race restarted on lap 110. Brad Keselowski passed Kenseth on the backstretch to take the lead on lap 164, won the second stage and the fourth caution flew for the conclusion of the second stage. Denny Hamlin exited pit road with the race lead. Jimmie Johnson restarted from the tail-end of the field for an uncontrolled tire.

Final stage

The race restarted on lap 212 and Hamlin lost the lead to Keselowski on the restart. Kevin Harvick passed Keselowski for the lead with 170 laps to go. Keselowski drove past Harvick on the outside exiting Turn 2 to retake the lead with 162 to go. Debris in the restart zone, a towel, brought out the fifth caution with 150 to go. Hamlin exited pit road with the race lead Kasey Kahne restarted the race from the tail-end of the field for speeding.

The race restarted with 144 to go. Keselowski edged out Hamlin at the start/finish line to retake the lead with 113 to go. A number of cars hit pit road with 84 to go to start a cycle of green flag pit stops. Keselowski pitted from the lead with 81 to go, giving it to Ryan Newman. Exiting pit road with 57 to go, Johnson slammed into teammate Earnhardt exiting Turn 2 and brought out the sixth caution. Earnhardt told reporters after the race that Johnson "said he didn’t see us. We were out there running around the top and weren’t ready to pit yet, and he said that he didn’t get any notice that there was a car on the outside. … Jimmie didn’t know I was there. Came off the corner and didn’t know I was there. It was an explosion. But the car held up pretty well.” Johnson said after the race that he was trying to decipher "if I just didn't hear it being told to me or if it wasn't told to me. It's still terrible, obviously. Man, I'm surprised our cars kept rolling after that because I just body-slammed him into the wall. And I could have easily not heard the clear or something else happened. I don't know. But that's the last thing you want to happen with a teammate.”

The race restarted with 51 to go. With 43 laps to go, Earnhardt suffered a left-rear tire cut and spun out in Turn 3, bringing out the seventh caution. During the caution, Ty Dillon spun out entering Turn 3 in front of Clint Bowyer. Hamlin exited pit road with the race lead.

The race restarted with 39 to go and Keselowski took the lead on the ensuing lap. Kenseth made contact with Chase Elliott in Turn 1 and his right-rear tire went flat with 38 to go. Debris brought out the eighth caution with 33 to go.  Keselowski and Logano stayed out while the rest of the drivers pitted.  Martin Truex Jr. restarted from the tail-end of the field for a commitment line violation.

The race restarted with 30 to go and Joey Logano passed Keselowski exiting Turn 2 on the ensuing lap to take the lead. The ninth caution flew with 24 to go when Ryan Blaney made contact with Kurt Busch exiting Turn 2, suffered a cut left-rear tire, spun out and slammed the wall in Turn 3. Kyle Larson opted not to pit and assumed the lead. Kyle Busch, commitment line violation, and Elliott, uncontrolled tire, restarted the race from the tail-end of the field for pit road infractions.

The race restarted with 20 to go. Logano passed Larson with 17 to go and drove on to score the victory.

Post-race

Driver comments
Logano said in victory lane it was "nice to break through and get our first points win of the year, that being on the 300th start. For me personally, it was kind of a cool milestone to hit and drive into victory lane with that, too.”

Hamlin, who finished a season best third, said after the race that third "was about as good as we had. You know, we just didn't have the speed that the other cars had. We talked about that Friday during media. But we optimized our day. It's the best we could do. We finished right where we should have.”

Stenhouse, who rebounded from hitting the wall early in the race to finish fourth, said he "had to fight hard for this top-five. I made a mistake early. I thought we had a car capable of running in the top five a lot. I got loose into [Turn] 3 and got into the fence and had to play catchup from there."

Race results

Stage results

Stage 1
Laps: 100

Stage 2
Laps: 100

Final stage results

Stage 3
Laps: 200

Race statistics
 Lead changes: 8 among different drivers
 Cautions/Laps: 9 for 53
 Red flags: 0
 Time of race: 3 hours, 12 minutes and 8 seconds
 Average speed:

Media

Television
Fox Sports covered their 17th race at the Richmond International Raceway. Mike Joy, two-time Richmond winner Jeff Gordon and six-time Richmond winner Darrell Waltrip had the call in the booth for the race. Chris Neville, Vince Welch and Matt Yocum handled the pit road duties for the television side.

Radio
MRN had the radio call for the race which will also be simulcast on Sirius XM NASCAR Radio. Joe Moore, Jeff Striegle and six-time Richmond winner Rusty Wallace called the race in the booth when the field raced down the frontstretch. Mike Bagley called the race from a platform inside the backstretch when the field raced down the backstretch. Winston Kelley, Alex Hayden and Glenn Jarrett worked pit road for the radio side.

Standings after the race

Drivers' Championship standings

Manufacturers' Championship standings

Note: Only the first 16 positions are included for the driver standings.
. – Driver has clinched a position in the Monster Energy NASCAR Cup Series playoffs.

References

Toyota Owners 400
Toyota Owners 400
Toyota Owners 400
NASCAR races at Richmond Raceway